Pick 6 may refer to:

Pick 6 (horse racing), a wager in which a bettor picks one horse in each of six races
Pick 6 (lottery), a game in which six regular numbers are picked
Pick 6 (American football), an interception returned for a touchdown
"Pick Six", a ranking system used by Ring of Honor to determine championship contenders